Tencent Music Entertainment Group (TME) is a company that develops music streaming services for the Chinese market. Tencent Music's apps include QQ Music, Kugou,  Kuwo, and WeSing; which have more than 800 million active users and 120 million paying subscribers. As of July 2016, Tencent Music's three services held an estimated 56% market share of music streaming services in China.

In the first quarter of 2021, Tencent Music announced it had 60.9 million paying users, up 42.6% compared to the 42.7 million paying users in the first quarter of 2020. In addition, the total number of music streaming users was announced to be 615 million, a drop of 6.4% compared to the first quarter of 2020 (657 million).

History 
Tencent Music was established in July 2016 with Tencent's purchase of China Music Corporation to strengthen its music offerings. On July 4, 2018, Sony/ATV Music Publishing acquired an equity stake in Tencent Music. In October 2018, the firm filed for IPOs of around $2 billion in the United States.

In December 2018, the company announced an IPO with the total value of shares around $1.23 billion, which includes 82 million ADS and 164 million regular shares priced around $13 - $15.

As of 2022, 8.62% of Tencent Music class A ordinary shares are owned by Spotify.

On January 30, 2019, SM Entertainment, the largest entertainment agency of South Korea entered into strategic partnership agreement with China's Tencent Music that included music distribution and marketing in the Chinese market.

In June 2020, the Government of India banned QQ Music with 58 other Chinese origin apps citing data and privacy issues. The border tensions in 2020 between India and China might have also played a role in the ban.

References

External links 
  

Tencent Music
Tencent divisions and subsidiaries
Chinese companies established in 2016
2018 initial public offerings
Companies listed on the New York Stock Exchange
Internet censorship in India